Deauville – Normandie Airport  - previously known as Deauville – Saint-Gatien Airport - is a small international airport situated 7 km east of Deauville, a commune of the Calvados département in the Normandy région of France.

In 2017, Deauville - Normandie airport handled 163,626 passengers, an increase of 17% over 2016.

Airlines and destinations 

The following airlines operate regular scheduled and charter flights to and from Deauville:

Statistics

References

External links 
Aéroport International de Deauville - Normandie (official site) 
Aéroport de Deauville - Normandie (Union des Aéroports Français) 

Airports established in 1931
Airports in Normandy
Deauville
Transport in Normandy